Jember Fashion Carnaval or JFC (Indonesian Karnaval Busana Jember) is an annual carnival held in the East Java city of Jember. Officially it is written as Jember Fashion Carnaval; the word carnival here is officially spelled as carnaval, probably a confusion with Indonesian spelling karnaval, or an influence of the Dutch spelling carnaval.  Jember Fashion Carnival has no relation with the Christian pre-Lenten festival, but more of a festivities in general, roughly following the Brazilian style, with procession of dancers in extravagant costumes, with emphasis on the traditional Indonesian motif.

Generally, the carnival used world-themed fashion or nature-inspired theme. Preparation was held extensively months before and participants volunteered for the event.

The idea for Jember Fashion Carnaval was realized by local fashion designer and educator Dynand Fariz. Initially, a world-themed fashion week known as Pekan Mode Dynand Fariz was held in 2001. In 2002, the fashion week was held around the city of Jember. This has inspired the creation of Jember Fashion Carnaval. The first Jember Fashion Carnaval was held on January 1, 2003, the same date as the founding day of Jember City. It was followed by another Jember Fashion Carnaval in August 2003. Since then the carnival is held on the month of August.

Starting From the rise of Group Reyog Ponorogo who crowded highways city protocol in the current cultural pageantry and celebration of the anniversary of the independence of Jember city which has always attracted the attention of citizens each year. Thus create the idea of thinking a walking parade with costumes menggenakan interesting, lively, bright colors and frilly audience reyog artists but has its own distinctive identity Jember city.

At the time of 2001 to the beginning of Jember Carnaval Festival, where there wasn't much different in concept from the previous procession, and therefore the shape resembling the costume of JFC always Reyog at which time there is also a similar event, such as a costume festival in the countries in American continent. Even today, tens Reyog group in the town of Jember still participate and support the JFC activities each year, so are always there at the JFC costume design that carries about reyog art.
Development

Even in the development, JFC is still carrying the national reyog event and Reyog mini. Participants now not followed by adults only, but the students of students kindergarten, elementary, junior high school which is more commonly called participants JFC Mini

See also 
Solo Batik Carnival

References

External links 
 

Festivals in Indonesia
Carnivals in Indonesia
Fashion events in Indonesia
Annual events in Indonesia
 
Fashion industry
East Java